Aku-Aku ('Devil', 'Ghost' or 'Spirit'), also known as Aku, Akuaku or Varua, are humanoid spirits in Rapa Nui mythology of the Easter Island.

Aku-Aku are spirits of the dead, but they are not immortal and can be disposed of. They can be of either sex, and different Aku-Aku are associated with particular areas of the Easter Island. Some of the Aku-Aku are deified. They originally arrived onto the island with Hotu Matuꞌa, the legendary first settler of Easter Island. The original group of Aku-Aku who arrived with Hotu Matuꞌa numbered around 90, and were generally cannibalistic in nature. 

Specific Aku-Aku includes:
 Uka-o-hoheru, female, who married the mortal Tupahotu
 Kava-ara and Kava-tua, females, who captured the mortal Uré-a-hohové until he was saved by another old Aku-Aku
 Mata-wara-ware and Papai-a-taki-vera, husband and wife, who capture human souls at night which would lead to their deaths
 Two Aku-Aku who were visited by Tu’u Koihu, son of Hotu Matuꞌa

Islanders who could communicate with Aku-Aku are known as koromaké or iva-atua. There were stories of iva-atuas being employed to dispose of particularly violent Aku-Aku. Aku-Aku was not particularly worshiped, but they were acknowledged before a meal was taken. It was said that Aku-Aku live off the aroma of a meal. A 'well-fed' and friendly Aku-Aku would participate in household chores for a family. When entering caves, which were thought to be their homes, ceremonial rituals such as umu tahu can be performed to ward off bad luck or misfortune.

References

Rapa Nui mythology
Easter Island